KCFC (1490 AM) is a radio station licensed to Boulder, Colorado. The station is owned by Colorado Public Radio (CPR), and airs CPR's "Colorado News" network, originating from KCFR-FM in Denver, Colorado.

The station signed on in 1947 as KBOL. Herb Hollister was President, and Russ Shaffer was vice president and general manager. Shaffer acquired majority interest in the station in 1953. Russ Shaffer's son Rusty became General Manager in the mid-70s and would become sole owner by 1985.

Programming 

KCFR-FM and KCFC broadcast programming from National Public Radio (including Morning Edition and All Things Considered), American Public Media (including A Prairie Home Companion & its successor, Live From Here), and Public Radio International (including This American Life and The World), as well as an original daily interview show called Colorado Matters.

References

External links
FCC History Cards for KCFC
cpr.org

CFC
NPR member stations
Radio stations established in 1946
1946 establishments in Colorado
CFC